Polglase is a surname. Notable people with the surname include:

Todd Polglase (born 1981), Australian rugby league footballer
Van Nest Polglase (1898–1968), American art director

See also
Worsdale v Polglase, a legal case in New Zealand